The New Zealand cricket team competed against Sri Lanka in a tour consisting of three ODIs and two Twenty20s. It ran from November 10th, 2013 to November 21st,  2013.

Regular New Zealand captain Brendon McCullum, along with former captain Ross Taylor ruled themselves out of the tour to focus on future test matches between West Indies and India. Kyle Mills was named as the stand-in captain.

Squads

ODI Series
All times are Indian Standard Time (IST)

1st ODI

2nd ODI

3rd ODI

Statistics

Batting 
Highest runs

Bowling 
Highest wicket taker

T20 Series

1st T20

2nd T20

Statistics

Batting 
Highest runs

Bowling 
Highest wicket taker

References

2013 in New Zealand cricket
2013 in Sri Lankan cricket
International cricket competitions in 2013–14
New Zealand cricket tours of Sri Lanka
Sri Lankan cricket seasons from 2000–01